Morumugão Sub-District is an administrative subdivision (tehsil) of Goa, India, headquartered at Mormugao. It is the state's only taluka (tehsil) to have all four modes of transport—air, road, rail, and sea.

History
Morumugão was one of the first places to be conquered and incorporated into the Velhas Conquistas of the Portuguese Empire in the East.

Settlements

City
Morumugão has one city: Morumugão-Vasco.

Towns
Morumugão has three towns: Sancoale, Cortalim, and Chicalim.

Villages
Morumugão has ten villages: Arossim, Cansaulim, Chicolna, Cuelim, Dabolim, Issorcim, Pale, Quelossim, São Jacinto Island, and Velsao.

Islands
Morumugão has four islands: Ilha de São Jacinto, Ilha de Pequeno (Bat Island), Ilha Grande, and Ilha de São Jorge.

References

External links 
 Cities and villages in Mormugao Taluk

Taluks of Goa
Geography of South Goa district